Greg or Gregory Bryant may refer to:

 Greg Bryant (computer scientist), American computer scientist
 Greg Bryant (astronomer), namesake of 9984 Gregbryant
 Greg Bryant (American football), see 2012 USA Today All-USA high school football team 
 Gregory R. Bryant (born 1950), United States Navy admiral